Loch Derculich is a freshwater loch in central highlands of Scotland, in Perth and Kinross. Loch Tummel is located three miles to the north.

Habitation
Evidence of Shieling huts in two groups are visible from oblique aerial photography, that consist of two groups in either side of a gully on the South of Loch Derculich. A trackway runs to the SW of the huts. What may be a hut-circle lies beside a more modern track to the north-east of the huts.

References

Derculich
Derculich
Tay catchment
Protected areas of Perth and Kinross